Muhamad Osamanmusa (born January 19, 1998) is a Thai futsal player. He plays for Córdoba CF Futsal in the Primera División de Futsal, the premier professional futsal league in Spain, and the Thailand national futsal team. He made his international debut at the 2016 AFF Futsal Championship.

Early life
Muhammad was born to a Nigerian father and a Thai mother in Bangkok. As his name implies, he is a Muslim. His father was also a footballer who played for the Thailand Tobacco Monopoly and the Port Authority of Thailand.

Muhammad lost his father when he was three years old. His maternal grandmother raised him while his mother worked abroad.

Honours

BTS Bangkok	
Thai FA Futsal Cup
 Winners (1): 2017-18
 AFF Futsal Club Championship  Winners (1) : 2018

Chonburi Bluewave	Futsal Thai League Winners (2): 2020, 2021-22

International
AFC U-20 Futsal Championship
 Third place (1):  2017
AFF Futsal Championship
 Winners (5): 2016, 2017, 2018, 2019, 2022
SEA Games
 Winners (2): 2017, 2021

International goals
Scores and results list Thailand's goal tally first.

References

Muhammad Osamanmusa
Muhammad Osamanmusa
1998 births
Living people
Futsal forwards
Muhammad Osamanmusa
Southeast Asian Games medalists in futsal
Competitors at the 2017 Southeast Asian Games
Thai expatriate sportspeople in Spain
Muhammad Osamanmusa
Competitors at the 2021 Southeast Asian Games
Muhammad Osamanmusa
Muhammad Osamanmusa